Rajeev Sethi (born 24 May 1949) is a noted Indian designer, scenographer and art curator. He is known for his outstanding designs across the world.

In 1986, he was awarded the Padma Bhushan, India's third highest civilian award, given Government of India.

Early life and background
Sethi was born in Delhi to freedom fighter parents. His mother, Krishna Sethi was a member of Delhi's first Legislative Assembly and his father Kishorilal Sethi was a businessman and a poet. He also had four elder sisters. He went to Modern School, New Delhi and studied History at St. Stephen's College, Delhi.

Career
Sethi spent his formative years in Paris, where he first went to study graphic art on a  scholarship. Thereafter he trained under painter and printmaker Stanley William Hayter at his studio, Atelier 17. He was mentored by American designers Ray and Charles Eames. Finally he got a chance to work at studio of French designer, Pierre Cardin. Meanwhile, in 1960, he designed Delhi's first discotheque, Cellar at Regal Building, Connaught Place.

He is curator and founder-chairman of the Asian Heritage Foundation. He designed the Jaya He GVK New Museum at the brand new T2 terminal in Mumbai.

He is also part of INTACH constituted the first Governing Council.

Jaya He GVK New Museum
The Jaya He Museum is spread over three km, an area covering 80,000 sq ft on walls at the Mumbai T2 terminal. The Jaya He GVK New Museum is the metaphorical centerpiece of the majestic new airport terminal.

Projects
 VIP Lounge, Delhi International Airport (1984)
 Shah House, Mumbai (1985–86)
 Spice Route Restaurant, the Imperial Hotel, New Delhi (1988–95)
 Laxmi Machine Works Headquarters, Coimbatore (1996)
 Art at the Grand Hyatt, Mumbai (2003)
 Hampi Resort (2006)
 Leela Kempinski (2008)
 Art at Hyatt (2012)
 Terminal 2 - Mumbai Airport (2014)

Awards and recognition
 Sanskriti Award for the field of outstanding social and cultural achievement (1980)
 National order of the Padma Bhushan from the President of India (1985)
 Honour Summus Medal by Watumull Foundation USA for design (1987)
 Designer of the Year, Interior Design - the Publication's Inaugural award (1992)
 Honoured by the Order of Merit of the Federal Republic of Germany (2001)
 Artisan Advocate by Aid to Artisans, USA (2004)
 Foundation Member of the World Academy of Art and Science, USA
 The First Indira Gandhi Lifetime Achievement Award for conservation by INTACH (Indian National Trust for Art & Cultural Heritage) 2010

References

External links
 Official site

20th-century Indian designers
1949 births
Indian art curators
Living people
People from Delhi
Indian interior designers
St. Stephen's College, Delhi alumni
Indian scenic designers
Recipients of the Padma Bhushan in civil service
Recipients of the Order of Merit of the Federal Republic of Germany
Atelier 17 alumni